Szőke Szakáll (born Jakab Grünwald, akas: Gärtner Sándor and Gerő Jenő; February 2, 1883  February 12, 1955), known in the English-speaking world as S. Z. Sakall, was a Hungarian-American stage and film character actor. He appeared in many films, including Casablanca (1942), in which he played Carl, the head waiter, Christmas in Connecticut (1945), In the Good Old Summertime (1949), and Lullaby of Broadway (1951). Sakall played numerous supporting roles in Hollywood musicals and comedies in the 1940s and 1950s. His rotund cuteness caused studio head Jack Warner to bestow on Sakall the nickname "Cuddles".

Early life and career

Gerő Jenő (later transcribed in English as Jacob Gero) was born in Budapest to a Jewish family. A sculptor's son, he was invalided out of the Hungarian army in World War I after a Russian bayonet wounded him in the chest. During his schooldays, he wrote sketches for Budapest vaudeville shows under the pen name Szőke Szakáll, meaning "blond beard", in reference to his own beard, grown to make him look older, which he affected when, at the age of 18, he turned to acting. In 1946, he became a United States citizen under the name of Jacob Gero (aka Szőke Szakáll).

The actor became a star of the Hungarian stage and screen in the 1910s and 1920s. At the beginning of the 1920s he moved to Vienna, where he appeared in Hermann Leopoldi's Kabarett Leopoldi-Wiesenthal. In the 1930s he was, next to Hans Moser, the most significant representative of Wiener Film, the Viennese light romantic comedy genre. He also appeared in Berlin. He appeared in Familientag im Hause Prellstein (1927), Ihre Majestät die Liebe (1929, which was remade in Hollywood as Her Majesty Love, with W.C. Fields in Sakall's role) and Two Hearts in Waltz Time (1930). For a brief period during this time, he ran his own production company.

War years

When the Nazis came to power in Germany in 1933, Sakall was forced to return to Hungary. He was involved in over 40 movies in his native land. When Hungary joined the Axis in 1940, he left for Hollywood with his wife. Many of Sakall's close relatives were later murdered in Nazi concentration camps, including all three of his sisters and a niece, as well as his wife's brother and sister.

Sakall began a Hollywood career that included "an endless succession of excitable theatrical impresarios, lovable European uncles and befuddled shopkeepers". His first American film role was in the comedy It's a Date (1940) with Deanna Durbin. The first big hit of his American career was Ball of Fire (1941) with Gary Cooper and Barbara Stanwyck. Later, he signed a contract with Warner Bros., where he had a number of other small roles, including one in Yankee Doodle Dandy (1942) with James Cagney.

Later the same year, at the age of 59, he portrayed his best remembered character, Carl the head waiter in Casablanca (1942). Producer Hal B. Wallis signed Sakall for the role three weeks after filming had begun. When he was first offered the part, Sakall hated it and turned it down. Sakall finally agreed to take the role provided they gave him four weeks of work. The two sides eventually agreed on three weeks. He received $1,750 per week for a total of $5,250. He actually had more screen time than either Peter Lorre or Sydney Greenstreet.

Later career

Sakall appeared in 30 further movies, including Never Say Goodbye (1946), Christmas in Connecticut reuniting with Barbara Stanwyck.  Sakall appeared in four films released in 1948: the drama Embraceable You, followed by April Showers, Michael Curtiz's Romance on the High Seas (Doris Day's film debut), and Whiplash. He was in four top movies in 1949. First Sakall played Felix Hofer in Doris Day's second film, My Dream Is Yours. Later that year, he supported June Haver and Ray Bolger in Look for the Silver Lining. Next, he played Otto Oberkugen in In the Good Old Summertime, with Judy Garland and Van Johnson. This was a remake of Ernst Lubitsch's The Shop Around the Corner (1940). Finally, Sakall was given the principal role of songwriter Fred Fisher in Oh, You Beautiful Doll, though top billing went to June Haver.

Sakall appeared in nine more movies during the 1950s, two of them musicals with Doris Day, playing J. Maxwell Bloomhaus in Tea for Two (1950) and Adolph Hubbell in Lullaby of Broadway (1951). His other roles included: Poppa Schultz in the Errol Flynn western Montana (1950); Miklos Teretzky in the June Haver musical The Daughter of Rosie O'Grady (also 1950); Don Miguel in the Randolph Scott western Sugarfoot; Uncle Felix in the musical Painting the Clouds with Sunshine (1951) with Virginia Mayo, and one of the episodes in the movie It's a Big Country (also 1951) featuring Gene Kelly, Van Johnson, Gary Cooper, Janet Leigh, Fredric March and Ethel Barrymore. His last movie was The Student Prince (1954).

Death
Sakall died of a heart attack in Hollywood on February 12, 1955, shortly after filming The Student Prince, ten days after his 72nd birthday. He is buried in the Garden of Memory in Forest Lawn Memorial Park in Glendale, California.

Partial filmography
Complete credits from 1940 on.

 Az újszülött apa (1916)
 A dollárnéni (1917)
 Professor Imhof (1926) as Dr. Hecht
 The Master of Death (1926) as Bordoni
 Hello Caesar! (1927, written)
 Heaven on Earth (1927) as Geschäftsführer
 Family Gathering in the House of Prellstein (1927) as Sami Bambus
 Da hält die Welt den Atem an (1928) as Theaterdirektor
 Mary Lou (1928) as Der Jongleur
 Whirl of Youth (1928) as Sam, ein Artist
 Pavement Butterfly (1929) as Paul Bennet – Maler
 The Merry Farmer (1927) as Dorfpolizist
 Why Cry at Parting? (1929) as Gottgetreu, Kassierer von Harder & Co.
 Two Hearts in Waltz Time, originally titled Zwei Herzen im 3/4 Takt or Zwei Herzen im Dreiviertel Takt (1930) as Der Theaterdirektor
 Twice Married (1930) as Grafenberg's brother-in-law
 Rendezvous (1930) as Crepin
 Susanne Cleans Up (1930) as Dr. Fuchs, juristischer Berater
 The Jumping Jack (1930) as Eickmeyer – Parfümfabrikant
 Her Majesty the Barmaid (1931) as Bela Török / Lias Vater
 Headfirst into Happiness (1931) as Baron Monteuil
 Die Faschingsfee (1931) as Matthias, Diener 
 Ihr Junge (1931)
 Walzerparadies (1931) as Schwartz, Theateragent
 Ich heirate meinen Mann (1931) as Adolphe
 Der Stumme von Portici (1931) as Ehemann
 The Squeaker (1931) as Bill "Billy" Anerley
 My Cousin from Warsaw (1931) as Burel, Lucienne's spouse
 The Woman They Talk About (1931) as Salewski Moretti
 The Soaring Maiden (1931) as Onkel Lampe
 The Unknown Guest (1931) as Leopold Kuhlmann
 Girls to Marry (1932) as Alois Novak
 Melody of Love (1932) as Bernhard
 I Do Not Want to Know Who You Are (1932) as Ottokar
 Countess Mariza (1932) as Lampe
 Overnight Sensation (1932) as Haase
 Tokajerglut (1933) as Schmidt, Pressephotograph
 A City Upside Down (1933) as Der Bürgermeister
 The Emperor's Waltz (1933) as Leitner – Fabrikant aus Budapest
 A Woman Like You (1933) as Theobald Roehn, Fabrikant
 Es war einmal ein Musikus (1933) as Häberlein
 Must We Get Divorced? (1933) as Professor Friedrich Hornung
 Grand Duchess Alexandra (1933) as Dimitri, Chefkoch im Hause der Großfürstin
 Pardon, tévedtem (1933) as Strangel úr, Murray menedzsere
 Adventures on the Lido (1933) as Michael
 Scandal in Budapest (1933) as Stangl
 Voices of Spring (1933) as Krüger, Schuldiener
 Az ellopott szerda (1933) as Schmidz, fotóriporter
 Wenn du jung bist, gehört dir die Welt (1934) as Beppo
 Everything for the Woman (1934)
  (1934) as Polgár papírkereskedõ
  (1934) as Anton Polgar, Stationery Shop Owner
 Bretter, die die Welt bedeuten (1935) as Franz Novak
 Viereinhalb Musketiere (1935) as Sattler, drummer
 Tagebuch der Geliebten (1935) as Dr. Walitzky
 Il diario di una donna amata (1935)
 Barátságos arcot kérek (1936) as Blazsek Mátyás fényképész
 Fräulein Lilli (1936) as Prokurist Seidl
 The Lilac Domino (1937) as Sandor
 Bubi (1937) as Moller
 It's a Date (1940) as Karl Ober
 Florian (1940) as Max
 My Love Came Back (1940) as Geza Peyer
 Spring Parade (1940) as Latislav Teschek – the Baker
 The Man Who Lost Himself (1941) as Paul
 The Devil and Miss Jones (1941) as George
 That Night in Rio (1941) as Penna
 Ball of Fire (1941) as Prof. Magenbruch
 Broadway (1942) as Nick
 Yankee Doodle Dandy (1942) as Schwab
 Seven Sweethearts (1942) as Mr. Van Maaster, the Father
 Casablanca (1942) as Carl, the waiter
 Wintertime (1943) as Hjalmar Ostgaard
 Thank Your Lucky Stars (1943) as Dr. Schlenna
 Shine On, Harvest Moon (1944) as Poppa Carl
 Hollywood Canteen (1944) as Himself (cameo)
 Wonder Man (1945) as Schmidt
 Christmas in Connecticut (1945) as Felix Bassenak
 The Dolly Sisters (1945) as Uncle Latsie Dolly
 San Antonio (1945) as Sacha Bozic
 Cinderella Jones (1946) as Gabriel Popik
 Two Guys from Milwaukee (1946) as Count Oswald
 Never Say Goodbye (1946) as Luigi
 The Time, the Place and the Girl (1946) as Ladislaus Cassel
 Cynthia (1947) as Professor Rosenkrantz
 April Showers (1948) as Mr. Curley
 Romance on the High Seas (1948) as Uncle Lazlo Lazlo
 Embraceable You (1948) as Sammy
 Whiplash (1948) as Sam
 My Dream Is Yours (1949) as Felix Hofer
 Look for the Silver Lining (1949) as Shendorf
 In the Good Old Summertime (1949) as Otto Oberkugen
 Oh, You Beautiful Doll (1949) as Fred Fisher aka Alfred Breitenbach
 Montana (1950) as Papa Otto Schultz
 The Daughter of Rosie O'Grady (1950) as Miklos 'Mike' Teretzky
 Tea for Two (1950) as J. Maxwell Bloomhaus
 Sugarfoot (1951) as Don Miguel Wormser
 Lullaby of Broadway (1951) as Adolph Hubbell
 Painting the Clouds with Sunshine (1951) as Uncle Felix
 It's a Big Country (1951) as Stefan Szabo
 Small Town Girl (1953) as Papa Eric Schlemmer
 The Student Prince (1954) as Joseph Ruder (final film role)

References

Bibliography

Further reading

External links

 
 
 
 
 Photographs of S. Z. Sakall

1883 births
1955 deaths
20th-century American male actors
20th-century Hungarian male actors
American people of Hungarian-Jewish descent
Austro-Hungarian Jews
Burials at Forest Lawn Memorial Park (Glendale)
Hungarian Jews
Hungarian expatriates in the United States
Hungarian male film actors
Hungarian male silent film actors
Hungarian male stage actors
Jewish American male actors
Jews who emigrated to escape Nazism
Male actors from Budapest
Warner Bros. contract players